Hawke is a lunar impact crater that is located on the southern hemisphere on the far side of the Moon. It lies within the larger Grotrian, located to the north of the huge walled plain Schrödinger, within the radius of that formation's outer blanket of ejecta.

The crater's name was approved by the IAU on 16 March 2018.  It is named after the American lunar scientist Bernard Ray Hawke (1946-2015).

References

External links
 Hawke Crater, LRO Camera team, Posted by David Portree on May 3, 2018 20:18 UTC.

Impact craters on the Moon